Alexander Ivanov (born May 1, 1956) is a Soviet-born American chess grandmaster. Born in Omsk, present-day Russia, he moved to the United States in 1988. FIDE awarded him his Grandmaster title in 1991. He lives in Massachusetts with his wife, fellow chess player and Woman International Master Esther Epstein.

Ivanov has competed in four FIDE World Championships (1999, 2000, 2002 and 2004) and four FIDE World Cups (2005, 2007, 2009 and 2011).

Ivanov played twice on the Soviet team in the World U26 Team Championship, winning the team Silver medal in 1978 and an individual Gold and team Gold in 1980. He then played for the US team in the 2002 Chess Olympiad. In an USCF tournament in early 2021, despite joining late and missing the first round, Ivanov tied third place with grandmaster Gadir Guseinov.

Besides chess, Ivanov has also been known to have a keen interest in programming.

Stats
ELO Classic: 2464

ELO Rapid: 1739

ELO Blitz: 2497

Most played openings with white pieces
 Robatsch (Modern) Defense
 Ruy Lopez, closed, 9.h3
 Queen's Indian, 4.g3
 Queen's Indian Defense

Most played openings with black pieces
 Sicilian, Najdorf, Fianchetto Variation
 Sicilian, Scheveningen Variation
 Caro-Kann Defense
 Sicilian Defense

Notable victories
In 2011, Ivanov defeated Varuzhan Akobian and Daniel Naroditsky in the US Championship.

In 1988, Ivanov won against IBM’s Deep Thought in Pittsburgh, Pennsylvania.

Notable placings
Ivanov won first at the 1980 Young Masters Championship of the USSR. He also tied for first with Anatoly Karpov and Boris Gulko at a 1982 Moscow tournament that featured 51 grandmasters. In addition, he shared first place in the 1989 National Open and World Open events. He was joint US champion in 1995 (with Nick de Firmian and Patrick Wolff), and Pan American champion in 1998. In 2007 he tied for first place with Julio Granda, Varuzhan Akobian, Darcy Lima and Eduardo Iturrizaga in the American Continental Championship in Cali.
He also won the 135th Annual New York State Championship in 2013, winning $1,500.

References

External links
 
 
 
 
 

1956 births
Living people
Chess grandmasters
Soviet chess players
American chess players
Chess Olympiad competitors
Sportspeople from Omsk